Roman Kozel (born 7 February 1997) is a Belarusian professional footballer who plays for Niva Dolbizno.

References

External links 
 
 

1997 births
Living people
Sportspeople from Brest, Belarus
Belarusian footballers
Association football defenders
FC Dynamo Brest players
FC Slonim-2017 players
FC Krumkachy Minsk players
FC Belshina Bobruisk players
FC Rukh Brest players
FC Granit Mikashevichi players